Tibisay Lucena was the president of the National Electoral Council or CNE until 2020, one of the five branches of government of the Bolivarian Republic of Venezuela. She was first elected to this post in 2006, and was reelected in 2009 for the 2009-2013 period. The Supreme Tribunal of Justice (TSJ) appointed Indira Alfonzo on June 12, 2020 as the new president of this entity.

Early life and education
Tibsay Lucena was born in Barquisimeto. She studied cello and performed with Venezuela's National Youth Orchestra and Simon Bolivar Symphony Orchestra (1980–87). Lucena earned a B.A. in sociology from the Central University of Venezuela and worked as a researcher at the Institute of Advanced Studies of Administration. She then pursued graduate studies in the United States, earning an M.A. in sociology from the New School for Social Research in New York.

Controversy
Lucena is considered to be pro-PSUV by the opposition, despite that the position she held must be exercised with neutrality.

Sanctions 
Lucena has been sanctioned by several countries and is banned from entering neighboring Colombia. The Colombian government maintains a list of people banned from entering Colombia or subject to expulsion. As of January 2019, the list had 200 people with a "close relationship and support for the Nicolás Maduro regime".

In July 2017, thirteen senior officials, including Lucena, of the Venezuelan government associated with the 2017 Venezuelan Constituent Assembly elections were sanctioned by the United States for their role in undermining democracy and human rights.

Canada sanctioned 40 Venezuelan officials, including Lucena, in September 2017. The sanctions were for behaviors that undermined democracy after at least 125 people will killed in the 2017 Venezuelan protests and "in response to the government of Venezuela's deepening descent into dictatorship".  Canadians were banned from transactions with the 40 individuals, whose Canadian assets were frozen.

The European Union sanctioned seven Venezuela officials, including Lucena, on 18 January 2018, singling them out as being responsible for deteriorating democracy in the country. The sanctioned individuals were prohibited from entering the nations of the European Union, and their assets were frozen.  

On 29 March 2018, Panama sanctioned 55 public officials, including Lucena, and Switzerland implemented sanctions, freezing the assets of seven ministers and high officials, including Lucena, due to human rights violations and deteriorating rule of law and democracy.

On 20 April 2018, the Mexican Senate froze the assets of officials of the Maduro administration, including Lucena, and prohibited them from entering Mexico.

See also
National Electoral Council (Venezuela)
Government of Venezuela
Elections in Venezuela

References

1959 births
Living people
Electoral branch of the Government of Venezuela
Central University of Venezuela alumni
Venezuelan sociologists
People from Barquisimeto
People of the Crisis in Venezuela